"True Step Tonight" is a song by UK garage duo True Steppers, released as their third single, featuring former East 17 singer Brian Harvey and U.S. R&B star Donell Jones on guest vocals. It reached number 25 on the UK Singles Chart.

Track listing
"True Step Tonight" (Radio Edit)
"True Step Tonight" (Zero Absolute Vocal Mix)
"True Step Tonight" (X-Men vs 10 Degrees Below Dub)

References

2000 songs
2000 singles
True Steppers songs
Brian Harvey songs
Donell Jones songs
NuLife singles
Song articles with missing songwriters